Subul Babo (born 1 June 1966) is a Papua New Guinean sprinter. He competed in the 400 metres at the 1992 Summer Olympics and the 1996 Summer Olympics.

References

External links

1966 births
Living people
Athletes (track and field) at the 1992 Summer Olympics
Athletes (track and field) at the 1996 Summer Olympics
Papua New Guinean male sprinters
Olympic athletes of Papua New Guinea
Commonwealth Games competitors for Papua New Guinea
Athletes (track and field) at the 1994 Commonwealth Games
Place of birth missing (living people)